Gevorg Aleksanyan (born July 4, 1981 in Armenian SSR) is an Armenian weightlifter. He competed at the 2004 Summer Olympics in the men's 77 kg division.

References

External links

1981 births
Living people
Armenian male weightlifters
Olympic weightlifters of Armenia
Weightlifters at the 2004 Summer Olympics